The spectacled imperial pigeon (Ducula perspicillata) is a species of bird in the family Columbidae.
It is endemic to the Maluku Islands.

Its natural habitats are subtropical or tropical moist lowland forest and subtropical or tropical mangrove forest.

Taxonomy and systematics 
The spectacled imperial pigeon is a species in the large genus of imperial pigeons, Ducula. Within the genus, it is most closely related to the Seram imperial pigeon, with which it is sometimes considered conspecific. These two species form a species group with the green imperial pigeon and elegant imperial pigeon.

The species' generic name comes from the New Latin ducula (duke), while the specific epithet perspicillata is from the Modern Latin perspicillata (spectacled), derived the Latin perspicillum (lens), which is itself from the Latin perspicere (to see through). Alternative names for the orange fruit dove include white-eyed imperial pigeon, white-spectacled imperial pigeon, and Moluccan imperial pigeon.

It is monotypic. However, the Seram imperial pigeon is sometimes considered to be a subspecies of this species.

References

Cited text 
 

spectacled imperial pigeon
Birds of the Maluku Islands
spectacled imperial pigeon
Taxonomy articles created by Polbot